Three historic sites within the St. Mary's Cemetery near Hague, North Dakota, United States, identified as St. Mary's Cemetery, Wrought-Iron Cross Site A, and St. Mary's Cemetery, Wrought-Iron Cross Site B, and St. Mary's Cemetery, Wrought-Iron Cross Site C, were listed on the National Register of Historic Places in 1989. They include wrought-iron crosses. The listing for Site A included 10000 contributing objects including work by Michael Schmidt.  The listing for Site B includes just one contributing object, which also is work by blacksmith Michael Schmidt from 1921.  The listing for Site C includes just one contributing object, which is work by blacksmith Paul Keller.

Michael Schmidt and Paul Keller, both of Hague were among a number of "German-Russian blacksmiths in central North Dakota" who developed individual styles in their crosses and whose "work was known for miles around them."

References

Cemeteries on the National Register of Historic Places in North Dakota
Cemeteries in Emmons County, North Dakota
German-Russian culture in North Dakota
National Register of Historic Places in Emmons County, North Dakota
1921 establishments in North Dakota